The 1985–86 Chicago Black Hawks season was the 60th season in franchise history. The Black Hawks, led by three 40-goal scorers in Denis Savard, Troy Murray and Al Secord, captured the Norris Division title for the first time since 1982–83 but were swept out of the first round of the playoffs by the Toronto Maple Leafs.

Offseason
After a successful 1984–85 season in which the Black Hawks made it to the Campbell Conference finals, the club was happy with their roster and did not make any major off-season moves. The club did announce that general manager Bob Pulford would remain the head coach, as he took over on an interim basis after Orval Tessier was fired in February.

At the 1985 NHL Entry Draft, the club selected defenceman Dave Manson with their first round, 11th overall pick. Manson played with the Prince Albert Raiders of the WHL, where he helped the club win the 1985 Memorial Cup. A tough player, Manson appeared in 72 games with Prince Albert, scoring eight goals and 38 points, as well as 247 penalty minutes during the 1984-85 season.

Regular season
Very early into the season, the Black Hawks acquired goaltender Bob Sauve from the Buffalo Sabres in exchange for a third round draft pick in the 1986 NHL Entry Draft. Sauve was coming off a 13-10-3 record with the Sabres in 1984–85 with a 3.22 GAA and a .855 save percentage in 27 games. He would split time with Murray Bannerman, replacing Warren Skorodenski, who was sent back to the AHL.

The Hawks started slow, posting a 4–9–1 record in their first 14 games, however, the club was in third place in the weak Norris Division, only two points out of first place. The Black Hawks continued to sputter along throughout the first half of December, as following a five-game losing streak, Chicago had a record of 9–15–4, although they still remained in third place, just ahead of the Toronto Maple Leafs. The Hawks eventually heated up, going 16–4–3 through their next 23 games, vaulting them into first place in the division with a 25–19–7 record. The team battled the Minnesota North Stars and St. Louis Blues for first place in the Norris Division, and Chicago eventually won the division with a 39–33–8 record, earning 86 points, winning the division for the first time since the 1982–83 season.

On offense, the Black Hawks finished third in the NHL with 351 goals. Denis Savard led the way with 49 goals and 116 points in 80 games, while Troy Murray had a breakout season offensively, scoring 45 goals and 99 points and a club high +32 rating in 80 games played. Eddie Olczyk also saw his offensive production increase significantly, scoring 29 goals and 79 points in 79 games played, as did Al Secord, who scored 40 goals and 76 points in 80 games, as well as leading Chicago with 201 penalty minutes. Steve Larmer had another solid season, scoring 36 goals and 76 points in 80 games, while Curt Fraser added 29 goals and 68 points in only 61 games played.

On defense, Doug Wilson led the way with 17 goals and 64 points in 79 games, while Behn Wilson had 13 goals and 50 points in 69 games. Keith Brown broke out offensively, scoring 11 goals and 40 points in 70 games, while Bob Murray had nine goals and 38 points in 80 games. Ken Yaremchuk scored 14 goals and 34 points in 78 games.

In goal, Murray Bannerman led the club with a 20–19–6 record in 48 games, while posting a 4.48 GAA and a .869 save percentage, and earning one shutout. Bob Sauvé had a 19–13–2 record in 38 games with a 3.94 GAA and a .886 save percentage. The Black Hawks finished the season allowing 349 goals, the fifth highest total in the league.

Final standings

Schedule and results

Playoffs

Toronto Maple Leafs 3, Chicago Black Hawks 0
The Black Hawks opened the 1986 Stanley Cup Playoffs against the Toronto Maple Leafs. The Maple Leafs struggled throughout the 1985-86 season, earning a record of 25–48–7, earning 57 points, placing them in fourth place in the Norris Division, which was 29 fewer points than the heavily favored first place Black Hawks.

The series opened at Chicago Stadium with Bob Sauvé getting the start in goal, and the Leafs took an early 1–0 after a goal by Steve Thomas only 3:46 into the game. The Black Hawks tied it up midway through the period on a goal by Doug Wilson, however, Toronto retook the lead before the end of the period on a goal by Wendel Clark, giving the Leafs a 2–1 lead. The teams then played to a scoreless second period. Early in the third, Chicago tied the game on a goal by Darryl Sutter 4:48 into the frame, however, just over a minute later, the Leafs took the lead again on a Gary Leeman goal. Walt Poddubny scored again for Toronto just over three minutes later, giving the Leafs a 4–2 lead. Late in the period, the Leafs Steve Thomas scored his second goal of the game, giving Toronto a 5–2 lead. The Hawks Tom Lysiak scored late in the game, as the final score was 5–3 for the Maple Leafs.

In game two, the Hawks changed goaltenders, as Murray Bannerman was given the start. In the first period, Dan Daoust scored early for Toronto, giving the Leafs a 1–0 lead 4:01 into the game. Denis Savard tied it up for Chicago midway through the period, however, Steve Thomas restored the lead for Toronto with just under five minutes remaining in the period. The Hawks' Denis Savard tied the game with 32 seconds remaining in the first period, as the score was 2–2 after one period. In the second, Denis Savard completed the hat trick just 1:04 into the period, giving the Black Hawks a 3–2 lead. Soon, Murray Bannerman was injured, the Hawks then pulled and replaced him with Bob Sauvé. With just over five minutes remaining in the second period, Denis Savard scored his fourth goal of the game, giving the Hawks a 4–2 lead. Toronto's Wendel Clark scored just over a minute later, making the score 4–3 for Chicago after two periods. In the third, there was no scoring until just over five minutes remaining in the period, when the Leafs Peter Ihnačák scored, tying the game at 4–4. Then, with only 56 seconds remaining, the Leafs Walt Poddubny scored, giving Toronto a late 5–4 lead. The Leafs sealed the win with an empty net goal by Steve Thomas, giving Toronto the 6–4 victory, and a 2–0 series lead. Leafs goaltender Allan Bester made 42 saves for the win.

The series shifted to Maple Leaf Gardens in Toronto, Ontario for the third game. The Black Hawks started goaltender Murray Bannerman for this game after the late collapse by Bob Sauvé in the previous game. The Maple Leafs came out strong in the first period, as Russ Courtnall and Rick Vaive scored, making it 2–0 for Toronto. In the second period, the Leafs continued to dominate the game, as they took a 5–0 lead after goals by Tom Fergus, Miroslav Fryčer, and Wendel Clark. The Black Hawks eventually scored two goals of their own, as Ken Yaremchuk and Tom Lysiak scored 17 seconds apart late in the period, cutting the Leafs lead to 5–2. In the third, the Leafs put the game out of reach after goals by Walt Poddubny and Russ Courtnall, as Toronto defeated the Black Hawks 7–2, and stunned the hockey world by sweeping Chicago out of the playoffs.

Player stats

Regular season
Scoring

Goaltending

Playoffs
Scoring

Goaltending

Note: Pos = Position; GP = Games played; G = Goals; A = Assists; Pts = Points; +/- = plus/minus; PIM = Penalty minutes; PPG = Power-play goals; SHG = Short-handed goals; GWG = Game-winning goals; MIN = Minutes played; W = Wins; L = Losses; T = Ties; GA = Goals-against; GAA = Goals-against average; SO = Shutouts; SA = Shots against; SV = Shots saved; SV% = Save percentage;

Awards and records

Transactions

Draft picks
Chicago's draft picks at the 1985 NHL Entry Draft held at the Metro Toronto Convention Centre in Toronto, Ontario.

Farm teams

See also
1985–86 NHL season

References

External links
 

Chicago Blackhawks seasons
Chicago Blackhawks
Chicago Blackhawks
Norris Division champion seasons
Chicago
Chicago